Somnium was originally a Latin word meaning "dream", and may refer to:
 Somnium (novel), a scientific fantasy in Latin by Johannes Kepler
 Somnium, a brand name for the drug lorazepam
 Somnium (album) a 7-hour album by the ambient musician Robert Rich
 Somnium, an album by SIANspheric
 Teemu Raimoranta, nickname Somnium, a former guitarist from the bands Finntroll and Impaled Nazarene
 Somnium (video game), also known as NesRom, a downloadable video game for the Nintendo DSi's DSiWare service
 Somnium, a fictional card game from the Civilization IV: Beyond the Sword mod Fall From Heaven
 Somnium, a short film made in 2017 which won three awards at different movie festivals. Made by a group called "Fiskekutter"
 Somnium: A Dancer's Dream, a 2019 dance show directed by Neil Jones

See also
 AI: The Somnium Files, an adventure video game